Merther Lane is a hamlet in the parish of St Michael Penkevil, Cornwall, England.

References

Hamlets in Cornwall